Michael Kieran (died 1869) was an Irish prelate of the Roman Catholic Church. He served as the Archbishop of Armagh and Primate of All Ireland from 1866 to 1869.

Biography
Kieran was Parish Priest of Dundalk (1848–1869) and Dean of the Archdiocese of Armagh (1857–1866). Following the death of Archbishop Joseph Dixon of Armagh, Kieran was Vicar Capitular of Armagh until elected archbishop by the Propaganda Fide on 30 July 1866. The election was approved by Pope Pius IX on 30 September, and decreed on 6 November 1866. He was consecrated at St. Patrick's Church, Dundalk by Cardinal Paul Cullen, Archbishop of Dublin on 3 February 1867. As archbishop, Kieran made Dundalk his mensal parish.

He died at his residence, Forthill, Dundalk, on 15 September 1869. His remains are interred in front of Our Lady's altar in St. Patrick's Church, Dundalk.

References

Bibliography

 
 

1869 deaths
Roman Catholic archbishops of Armagh
19th-century Roman Catholic bishops in Ireland
Year of birth unknown
1803 births